Cordova High School is a public high school serving grades 9 to 12. It is in the Folsom-Cordova Unified School District and located in Rancho Cordova, California - east of Downtown Sacramento on US 50. Cordova High School opened in 1963 and graduated the first class of students in 1965. Before the Cordova High School campus opened, the students in Rancho Cordova attended high school at Folsom High located at 715 Riley Street in Folsom.

Demographics
The demographic breakdown of the 1,692 students enrolled for the 2016-2017 school year was:
Male - 51.4%
Female - 48.6%
Native American/Alaskan - 0.5%
Asian - 8.6%
Black - 13.0%
Hispanic - 34.9%
Native Hawaiian/Pacific islanders = 1.7%
White - 37.4%
Multiracial - 3.9%

64.7% of the students were eligible for free or reduced-cost lunch. For 2016-17, Cordova High School was a Title I school.

Notable alumni

References

External links
 

1963 establishments in California
educational institutions established in 1963
high schools in Sacramento County, California
public high schools in California
Rancho Cordova, California